The men's 4 × 400 metres relay event at the 1983 Summer Universiade was held at the Commonwealth Stadium in Edmonton on 8 and 9 July 1983.

Results

Heats

Final

References

Athletics at the 1983 Summer Universiade
1983